The 1945 NCAA basketball tournament was an eight-team single-elimination tournament to determine the national champion of men's National Collegiate Athletic Association (NCAA) college basketball. It began on March 22, 1945, and ended with the championship game on March 27 in New York City. A total of nine games were played, including a third place game in each region.

Oklahoma A&M, coached by Henry Iba, won the national title with a 49–45 victory in the final game over NYU, coached by Howard Cann. Bob Kurland of Oklahoma A&M was named the tournament's Most Outstanding Player.

Locations
The following are the sites selected to host each round of the 1945 tournament:

Regionals

March 22 and 24
East Regional, Madison Square Garden, New York, New York
March 23 and 24
West Regional, Municipal Auditorium, Kansas City, Missouri

Championship Game

March 27
Madison Square Garden, New York, New York

Teams

Bracket
* – Denotes overtime period

Regional third place

Notes
 This was the first appearance for Oklahoma A&M, who would win their first two NCAA tournaments. They would be the first team to win multiple tournaments, and the first team to repeat as champions. Of the nine other teams to win the championship in their first tournament appearance, only San Francisco was able to repeat as well. 
 Three teams - NYU, Ohio State and Oklahoma A&M - would return for the 1946 tournament. Arkansas and Kentucky would both return within four years; Utah would not return to the tournament until 1955, and Oregon would not return until 1960.
 This was the only appearance of then-Tufts College, who are currently in Division III. Tufts is one of fourteen colleges and universities to have made the NCAA tournament and no longer be in Division I.

See also
 1945 National Invitation Tournament
 1945 NAIA Basketball Tournament

References

NCAA Division I men's basketball tournament
Tournament
NCAA basketball tournament
NCAA basketball tournament